The Indian five paise (singular: Paisa), is former denomination of the Indian Rupee. The 5 coin equals  of the Indian Rupee.

History
Prior to 1957, Indian rupee was not decimalised and the rupee from 1835 to 1957 AD was further divided into 16 annas. Each anna was further divided to four Indian pices and each pice into three Indian pies till 1947 when the pie was demonetized. In 1955, India amended the "Indian Coinage Act" to adopt the metric system for coinage. Paisa coins were introduced in 1957, but from 1957 to 1964 the coin was called "Naya Paisa" (English: New Paisa. Plural: Naye paise). On 1 June 1964, the term "Naya" was dropped and the denomination was simply called "One paisa" (or paise for denomination greater than one). Paisa coins were issued as a part of "The Decimal Series". Five paise coins were minted from 1964 to 1984. 5 paise was equivalent to four-fifths of an anna (0.8 anna).

Mintage
Five paise coins were minted from 1961 to 1984 at the India Government Mints in Mumbai, Kolkata and Hyderabad. The coins were demonetized in 1994.

Mint marks
Depending on the mint producing the coins, following mint marks appear:

Total mintage
Total 4,924,011,110 coins were minted from 1964 to 1994.

Composition
Five paise coins were minted from Cupronickel, Aluminium and Aluminium-magnesium in medallic alignment. The coins were rhombus shaped and had smooth edge. 

1964-1966: Cupronickel.
1967-1984: Aluminium.
1984-1994: Aluminium-magnesium.

Variants

See also
 Indian paisa

References

Coins of India
Historical currencies of India
Five-cent coins